HCLS1 binding protein 3 also known as HS1BP3 is a protein which in humans is encoded by the HS1BP3 gene.

Function 

The protein encoded by this gene shares similarity with mouse Hs1bp3, an Hcls1-interacting protein that may be involved in lymphocyte activation.

HS1BP3 binds members of the 14-3-3 protein family, which are highly expressed in motor neurons and Purkinje cells and regulate the Ca2+ / calmodulin-dependent protein kinase activation of tyrosine and tryptophan hydroxylase.

References